Parsonsia straminea, commonly known as  common silkpod or monkey rope, is a woody vine of the dogbane family, Apocynaceae. It occurs in the states of New South Wales and Queensland in Australia.

Taxonomy
Prolific botanist Robert Brown collected the species between October and November 1804 from the Hunter and Williams Rivers in New South Wales. He described the species as Lyonsia straminea in his 1810 work Prodromus Florae Novae Hollandiae et Insulae Van Diemen. Brown noted that it was closely related to Parsonsia, differing only in the structure of the capsule. The genus name commemorated mathematician and botanist Israel Lyons, who had published a survey of Cambridge flora. The species name straminea is Latin for "straw-coloured". Ferdinand von Mueller reclassified it in Parsonsia in 1868.

Description
Parsonsia straminea is a vine, whose woody stems can reach   in diameter, and extend for   into the tree canopy. The species climbs by twining, aided by its adventitious roots. The plant exudes a clear pale brown sap when cut or damaged. The leathery adult leaves are arranged oppositely (arising in pairs) along the stems and are yellowish green on their upper surface and pale grey-green (glaucous) on the undersurface. The fragrant pale yellow flowers are produced in panicles from November to June, peaking over February. The feathery seeds are carried by the wind and dispersed.

Distribution and habitat
Parsonsia straminea occurs along Australia's east coast, from northeastern Queensland south to southern New South Wales as far south as Mount Gulaga. It grows in shady spots in rainforest and rainforest margins, as well as floodplains, on fertile basalt- and sandstone-based soils.

Ecology
Parsonsia straminea is foraged upon by caterpillars of the common crow (Euploea core) and the Cairns hamadryad (Tellervo zoilus subsp. zoilus).

Cultivation
Parsonsia straminea can grow in a range of soil types and aspects. It can be used to cover fences and screens, though could smother nearby plants. It can be propagated by cuttings or layering.

References

External links
Occurrence data from Australasian Virtual Herbarium for Parsonsia straminea

straminea
Gentianales of Australia
Flora of New South Wales
Flora of Queensland
Plants described in 1810
Vines
Taxa named by Robert Brown (botanist, born 1773)